Legacy Games (also known as Legacy Interactive) is a game publisher and distributor of casual and indie titles for PC and mobile. It distributes games digitally on its website, at www.legacygames.com.  Legacy also sells physical discs with digital codes in Walmart stores as well as on Amazon. Legacy is best known for its game packs and sells more than 100 different bundles of themed hidden object, indie, puzzle, adventure, match 3, and simulation titles. 

Ariella Lehrer currently serves as CEO of Legacy Games, which she founded in 1998. Based in Los Angeles, Legacy Games has created and published many hidden object and adventure game titles based on TV brands such as Ancient Aliens, Doctor Who, Paranormal State, Sherlock Holmes, Criminal Minds, Murder, She Wrote, Ghost Whisperer, Law & Order, ER, Twilight Zone, Psych, Jane Austen, Clueless, Mean Girls, and Pretty in Pink.  Legacy's many educational game credits include pioneering "real-life games" such as the Zoo Vet, Pet Pals: Animal Doctor, and Emergency Room products, plus three Crayola creativity titles. 

Legacy distributes the games of over 75 developers and publishers, including Curve Digital, Artifex Mundi, Microids, Domini Games, Gamehouse, Big Fish Games, Alawar, and Kalypso, among others.

Legacy Original Titles

Awards
Crayola DJ
Parents' Choice Award Winner - 2015 Mobile App Award - Fun Stuff
(NAPPA) National Parenting Publications Awards: 2015 Bronze Winner
Creative Child Magazine: 2015 Mobile App Creative Play of the Year Award
The Parenting Center: The National Parent Center's Seal of Approval
Kids First! Certified Endorsement

Atlantis: Pearls of the Deep
Gamezebo's 2012 Match-3 Game of the Year

Zoo Vet
Parents' Choice Approved Award Winner
National Parenting Center's Seal of Approval

Pet Pals: Animal Doctor
Parents' Choice Silver Award Winner

Pet Pals: New Leash on Life
Parents' Choice 2009 Gold Award Winner

The Tuttles Madcap Misadventures
Game Tunnel 2007 Kid's Game of the Year – Innovation

Zoo Vet Endangered Animals
2008 Parents' Choice Gold Award Winner

References

External links

Video game companies of the United States
Video game companies established in 1998
American companies established in 1998